Rupaund is a town in Umaria district of Madhya Pradesh, India.

Cities and towns in Umaria district